Kolltveit is a village in Øygarden municipality in Vestland county, Norway. The village lies on the eastern shore of the island of Sotra.

National Road 555 reaches Kolltveit via the Kolltveit Tunnel, and intersects with the terminus of County Road 561 in a roundabout before heading south. There is a golf course in the area.

References

Villages in Vestland
Øygarden